Alojz Lah (born 17 July 1958) is a Slovenian equestrian. He competed in two events at the 1984 Summer Olympics.

References

External links
 

1958 births
Living people
Slovenian male equestrians
Slovenian dressage riders
Olympic equestrians of Yugoslavia
Equestrians at the 1984 Summer Olympics
People from Sežana